Stan Kosmala (born 19 February 1950) is an Australian Paralympic competitor, who has competed in athletics, wheelchair basketball, lawn bowls and shooting.  Born in Germany, he contracted polio at the age of two. He is married to Paralympic shooter Libby Kosmala, whom he met through wheelchair sport, and has two sons and two grandchildren.

He participated in the 1976 Toronto Games in athletics events, and also as a member of the Australia men's national wheelchair basketball team. He won a gold medal at the 1988 Seoul Games in lawn bowls in the Men's Pairs 2–6 event with Roy Fowler. At the 2000 Sydney Games, he came ninth just behind his wife in the preliminary round of the Mixed Air Rifle Prone SH1- event, and did not make the final.

References

Paralympic athletes of Australia
Paralympic lawn bowls players of Australia
Australian male bowls players
Paralympic shooters of Australia
Wheelchair category Paralympic competitors
Athletes (track and field) at the 1976 Summer Paralympics
Wheelchair basketball players at the 1976 Summer Paralympics
Lawn bowls players at the 1988 Summer Paralympics
Shooters at the 2000 Summer Paralympics
Medalists at the 1988 Summer Paralympics
Paralympic gold medalists for Australia
Paralympic medalists in lawn bowls
German emigrants to Australia
German expatriate sportspeople in Australia
1950 births
Living people